The Left Front is a political alliance in the Indian state of Tripura. The Left Front governed Tripura 1978–1988, and again from 1993 to 2018. The Communist Party of India (Marxist) is the dominant party in the coalition. The other members of the Left Front are the Communist Party of India, the Revolutionary Socialist Party, and the All India Forward Bloc.

History
The Left Front, then consisting of CPI,CPI(M), AIFB and RSP, won a landslide victory in the 1977 Tripura Legislative Assembly election. CPI(M) won 51 out of 60 seats in the Assembly, RSP 2, AIFB 1 and Left Front-supported independents 2. The combined Left Front votes was 390,314 (52% of the state-wide vote). In 1978 the Left Front government enacted reform of local governance, instituting an elected two-tier panchayat system. The Left Front government also enacted reforms granting official status to Kok Borok language and the creation of the Tripura Tribal Areas Autonomous District Council.

The Left Front won the 1983 Tripura Legislative Assembly election. On 11 January 1983 a 12-member Left Front cabinet with Nripen Chakraborty as Chief Minister was sworn in.

Ahead of the 1988 Tripura Legislative Assembly election Prime Minister Rajiv Gandhi charged the Left Front with having failed to contain the Tripura National Volunteers insurgency. The Indian National Congress (I) - TUJS combine won the election. Gandhi declared the entire state as a 'Disturbed Area' and in the tumultuous first 100 days of the Congress(I)-TUJS government cracked down on the Left Front. Over 2,000 Left Front activists were framed in the different cases, arrest warrants issued for 7,000 Left Front activists and CPI(M) and mass organization offices were seized or attacked across the state.

Manik Sarkar became the Chief Minister of Tripura in 1998.

In the 2000 TTAADC election the Left Front lost its majority of the council to the Indigenous People's Front of Tripura. The Left Front regained control over TTAADC in 2005. CPI(M) won 21 out of the 28 seats in the council, CPI 1, RSP and AIFB 1. The remaining 4 seats were won by the National Socialist Party of Tripura, supported by the Left Front.

However, in 2018 Tripura Legislative Assembly election, the Left Front was defeated by the Bharatiya Janata Party-Indigenous People's Front of Tripura combine, who won a landslide majority of 43 seats out of the 59 seats on which  election was held and Biplab Kumar Deb of Bharatiya Janata Party became the 10th Chief Minister of Tripura.

Members

Electoral history

See also
 Left Democratic Front (Kerala)
 Left Front (West Bengal)
 Secular Democratic Forces
 List of communist parties in India

Notes

References

Political parties in Tripura
Political party alliances in India
1970s establishments in Tripura
Political parties established in the 1970s